Presidential elections were held in Portugal on 8 June 1958, during the authoritarian Estado Novo regime led by Prime Minister António de Oliveira Salazar.

Incumbent President Francisco Craveiro Lopes had clashed with Salazar and did not seek another term, either as candidate of the regime or for the opposition, which deemed the incumbent president capable of winning the race. In Craveiro Lopes' place, the National Union, the sole legal political party, levied naval minister Américo Thomaz, a conservative.

The democratic opposition backed Air Force General Humberto Delgado, who ran as an independent in an attempt to challenge the regime. When asked if he would retain Salazar if elected, Delgado famously replied, "Obviously, I'll sack him." Delgado knew that under Portugal's corporatist constitution, the president still had the right to dismiss the prime minister, which was effectively the only check on Salazar's power.

The official tally was 76.4 percent for Thomaz and 23.6 percent for Delgado. The regime's secret police force, PIDE, harassed and attacked Delgado voters and supporters, and there were many reports of widespread electoral fraud. For example, Salazar refused to allow opposition representatives to observe the counting of ballots.

Many neutral observers believe that Delgado would have won in a landslide had Salazar allowed an honest election. Nevertheless, the results came as a shock to Salazar. Leaving nothing to chance, in 1959 he had the Constitution amended to transfer the presidential election to the National Assembly, which was a pliant tool of the regime. As a result, the 1958 election would be the only presidential election under the Estado Novo in which an opposition candidate actually stayed in the race until election day. In previous years, when the regime's candidate faced any opposition at all, any candidates put forward by the opposition were intimidated into withdrawing before the polls opened.

Universal suffrage was not reintroduced until after the Carnation Revolution and the return of democracy in 1974.

Official Results

|-
!style="background-color:#E9E9E9" align=left colspan="2" rowspan="2"|Candidates 
!style="background-color:#E9E9E9" align=left rowspan="2"|Supporting parties 	
!style="background-color:#E9E9E9" align=right colspan="2"|First round
|-
!style="background-color:#E9E9E9" align=right|Votes
!style="background-color:#E9E9E9" align=right|%
|-
|style="width: 10px" bgcolor=blue align="center" | 
|align=left|Americo Thomaz
|align=left|National Union
|align="right" |765,081
|align="right" |76.42
|-
|style="width: 8px" bgcolor=#777777 align="center" |
|align=left|Humberto Delgado
|align=left|Independent
|align="right" |236,057
|align="right" |23.58
|-
|style="width: 5px" style="background-color:red;text-align:center;"| 
|style="text-align:left;"|Arlindo Vicente
|style="text-align:left;"|Portuguese Communist Party
|colspan="2" style="text-align:center;" |left the race
|-
|colspan="3" align=left style="background-color:#E9E9E9"|Total valid
|width="65" align="right" style="background-color:#E9E9E9"|1,001,138
|width="40" align="right" style="background-color:#E9E9E9"|100.00
|-
|align=right colspan="3"|Blank/Invalid ballots
|width="65" align="right" |
|width="40" align="right" |
|-
|colspan="3" align=left style="background-color:#E9E9E9"|Total 
|width="65" align="right" style="background-color:#E9E9E9"|1,001,138
|width="40" align="right" style="background-color:#E9E9E9"|77.32
|-
|colspan="3" align=left style="background-color:#E9E9E9"|Registered voters
|width="65" align="right" style="background-color:#E9E9E9"|1,294,779
|width="40" align="right" style="background-color:#E9E9E9"|
|-
| colspan=5 style="text-align:left;"|Candidate left the race in favour of Humberto Delgado.
|-
|colspan=5 align=left|Source: Fórum História, Elections in Portugal
|}

References

See also
 President of Portugal
 Portugal
 Politics of Portugal

Portugal
Presidential election 
1958
Portuguese presidential election